Azeca is a European genus of small air-breathing land snails, terrestrial pulmonate gastropod mollusks in the family Cochlicopidae.

Species 
The only known species in the genus Azeca is:
 Azeca goodalli (A. Férrusac, 1821) - the type genus

Extinct species
 Azeca baudoni Michaud, 1862 †
 Azeca boettgeri Andreae, 1884 †
 Azeca frechi Andreae, 1902 †
 Azeca lemoinei (Cossmann, 1889) †
 Azeca loryi Michaud, 1862 †
 Azeca lubricella O. Boettger, 1870 †
 Azeca miliolum Paladilhe, 1873 †
 Azeca moljavkoi Prysjazhnjuk in Gozhik & Prysjazhnjuk, 1978 †
 Azeca monocraspedon Slavík, 1869 †
 Azeca paramonovae Prisyazhnyuk in Luleva & Prisyazhnyuk, 1990 †
 Azeca peneckei Andreae, 1892 †
 Azeca perspicua Brusina, 1902 †
 Azeca pumila Slavík, 1869 †
 Azeca sexdentata Gottschick, 1920 †
 Azeca tridentiformis (Gottschick, 1911) †
 Azeca vitrea Klika, 1891 †

References 

  Bank, R. A. (2017). Classification of the Recent terrestrial Gastropoda of the World. Last update: July 16th, 2017

External links
 AnimalBase info at: 
 Black-and-white image of shell at 
 Bourguignat, J.-R. (1859). Aménités Malacologiques. § LXVIII. Notice monographique sur le genre Azeca. Revue et Magasin de Zoologie Pure et Appliquée. (2) 10 (12) [“1858”: 527-545, pl. 18; (2) 11 (1): 16-21. Paris (≥ January; > January). [= Aménités Malacologiques, Tome second (livr. 5): 85-109, pl. 14 (1859). Paris]

Pupilloidea